The 20th Goya Awards took place at the Palacio Municipal de Congresos in Madrid, Spain on 29 January 2006.

Winners and nominees

Major award nominees

Other award nominees

Honorary Goya
 Pedro Masó

References

20
2005 film awards
2005 in Spanish cinema
2006 in Madrid